Alan Knott-Craig (born 14 August 1977, Pretoria, South Africa) is a South African entrepreneur and author. He is the founder of Project Isizwe

Early life
Alan Knott-Craig (jnr) was born on 14 August 1977 in Pretoria, where he lived until he left school in 1995.

His early school career was at home where his mother, a qualified teacher, ran a kindergarten. At age 6, he went to Glenstantia Primary School, graduating to the Glen High School, Pretoria in 1991.

His father, Alan Knott-Craig (Senior), was Senior General Manager of Mobile Communications at Telkom SA, and later CEO of South African mobile networks, Vodacom (1996-2008) and Cell C (2012-2014).

In 1996, Knott-Craig (jnr) was accepted for a BCom Accounting at Nelson Mandela Metropolitan University (formerly University of Port Elizabeth).  He graduated in 1998, and completed his postgraduate degree, B Com Honours in Accounting, in 1999. He did his articles at Deloitte Cape Town between 2000 and 2002.

Career
Knott-Craig qualified as a Chartered Accountant (SA) at the end of 2002. He worked in the New York City office of Deloitte USA for a short period.

He returned to South Africa and in October 2003 he founded Cellfind, one of South Africa's first mobile-location-based service providers and served as CEO until 2005. In 2006 he was appointed as CEO of iBurst and built one of South African's largest wireless broadband networks. After the birth of his first daughter, he left iBurst in 2009 to relocate to Stellenbosch. In 2010 he founded and became CEO of World of Avatar, an investment house for apps for Africa and later acquired and became CEO of Mxit, Africa's biggest social network.

He left Mxit and World of Avatar in October 2012 after a disagreement with his partners.

In 2013 he founded 'Project Isizwe, a non-profit company managing the deployment of the largest public free Wi-Fi network in South Africa. In 2014 he founded Herotel, a wireless broadband provider in South Africa,

Between 2003 and 2013 he co-founded and/or funded 17 companies in the Technology, Media and Telecommunications sector in Africa, including Cellfind, Lucky Mobile, iFind34600, COLV, World of Avatar, Toodu, FSMS, Triloq, 6th Line, Daily Maverick, ARC Telecoms, Pondering Panda, MorMor Media, and Boom.fm.

Personal life
Knott-Craig married Sibella Bosman in 2002. They have three daughters and live in Stellenbosch, South Africa.

Publications
In April 2008, he published Don't Panic, based on an e-mail he sent to his staff aimed at persuading South Africans to stay in the country and contribute positively. The book became the best selling book in South Africa for 2008. In 2019 he wrote a follow-up article.

This was followed in 2012 by Mobinomics: Mxit and South Africa's Mobile Revolution which he co-authored with Gus Silber. Really, Don't Panic and Moenie Stres nie a follow-up of Don't Panic was published in 2014. In 2015 he co-authored So, You Want To Be A Hero, a collection of essays, tips and cartoons targeted at young people looking to fast track their careers.

He writes a daily blog for entrepreneurs at www.bigalmanack.com

Awards and recognition
Knott-Craig was named as a Young Global Leader by the World Economic Forum in 2009. Forbes'' listed him as one of the top 10 young African millionaires to watch in 2013. He was also included in “100 Choiseul Africa", a list of top 100 young African business leaders in 2014.

References

1977 births
South African businesspeople
Living people